The Massa is a seven kilometre long river in the eastern Bernese Alps in the Swiss canton of Valais. It is mainly fed by the melt-water from the Aletsch Glacier. It passes through the Massa Gorge and flows into the Stausee Gibidum reservoir and onwards to its confluence with the Rhône.

The whole area, including other glaciers is part of the Jungfrau-Aletsch Protected Area, which was declared a UNESCO World Heritage Site in 2001.

See also

List of glaciers
Retreat of glaciers since 1850
Swiss Alps

References
The Massa on the National Map of Switzerland

Massa
Rivers of Valais